The Battle of Feyiase was the decisive battle in the struggle that led to the Ashanti Empire replacing Denkyira as the dominant power among the Twi-speaking Akan peoples.

During the battle, the Denkyira army deployed 2 or 3 Dutch cannons while the Ashanti had limited access to firearms. Prior to this battle the Denkyirahene Ntim Gyakari believed he was doing well in the war, having driven the Ashanti forces from Adunku, Abuontem and Aputuogya.  However, this was all part of Osei Tutu's plan to ambush the Denkyira troops at Feyiase. 

At Feyiase, the full force of the Asante war machine fell upon the Denkyiran army, and they were routed. Ntim Gyakari was killed by the people of Adunku from Asante Feyiase and Denkyira's cannons were captured by the Ashanti. Denkyira's hegemony was broken at Feyiase Akoyem. Feyiase Akoyem is now a part of Bosomtwe District which lies between Aputuogya and Esereso where the war ended.

References 

McCaskie, T. C. "Denkyira in the Making of Asante" in The Journal of African History. vol. 48 (2007), no. 1, p. 3.

Feyiase
Feyiase
Ashanti Empire
History of Ghana
Feyiase
1701 in Africa